Eoin Collins (born 28 July 1968 in Dublin) is a former tennis player from Ireland.

Collins represented his native country in the doubles competition at the 1992 Summer Olympics in Barcelona, partnering Owen Casey. The pair was eliminated in the second round there.

The left-hander Collins reached his highest singles ATP-ranking on 15 July 1991, when he became World Number 461.

External links
 
 

1968 births
Living people
Irish male tennis players
Olympic tennis players of Ireland
Tennis players from Dublin (city)
Tennis players at the 1992 Summer Olympics